The Linda McCartney Story is a 2000 British-American drama television film directed by Armand Mastroianni, starring Elizabeth Mitchell and Gary Bakewell. Based on the book Linda McCartney: The Biography, presenting the life story of Linda McCartney and her life with singer Paul McCartney. The film was shot in Vancouver, British Columbia, Canada for CBS and was released in 2000.

Cast
 Elizabeth Mitchell as Linda McCartney	 
 Gary Bakewell as Paul McCartney	 
 David Lewis as Danny Field	 
 Nicole Oliver as Felicia	 
 Tim Piper as John Lennon	 
 Matthew Harrison as Mick Jagger	 
 Claude Duhamel as Keith Richards
 Aaron Grain as Jim Morrison
 George Segal as Lee Eastman
 Jodelle Ferland as Heather

Soundtrack

External links 
 
 

2000 television films
2000 films
2000 biographical drama films
American biographical drama films
Biographical films about musicians
CBS network films
Films shot in Vancouver
Films directed by Armand Mastroianni
Linda McCartney
Paul McCartney
Cultural depictions of the Beatles
Cultural depictions of the Rolling Stones
Cultural depictions of photographers
2000s English-language films
2000s American films